Pyrgostylus is a genus of sea snails, marine gastropod mollusks in the family Pyramidellidae, the pyrams and their allies.

Species
Species within the genus Pyrgostylus include:
 Pyrgostylus striatulus (Linnaeus, 1758)

References

 Monterosato T. A. (di) (1884). Nomenclatura generica e specifica di alcune conchiglie mediterranee. Palermo, Virzi, 152 pp

External links
 To World Register of Marine Species

Pyramidellidae